David Wynne may refer to:
 David Wynne (composer) (1900–1983), Welsh composer
 David Wynne (sculptor) (1926–2014), English sculptor